Galvanus may refer to:

People
Galvanus de Bettino (c. 1335–c. 1394), also called Galvanus de Bononia, Galvanus Becchini, Italian religious scholar
Galvanus de Levanto  (fl. 14th century), also called Galvanus Januensis, Galvanus of Genoa, and Galvano de Gines), Italian theologian, physician to Pope Benedict XII
Luigi Galvani (1737–1798), Italian physician and physicist

Other
Galvanus, an alternate name for Gawain
Lamp of Galvanus, sometimes called lamp of Galvanus Martianus, an artifact mentioned in the 1658 work Hydriotaphia, Urn Burial by Thomas Browne
Silentium Galvanus, a bogus homeopathic medicine named in an internet meme; see Galvão Bueno#Cala a boca Galvão (Internet meme)

See also
Galvano (disambiguation)
Galgano (disambiguation)